Land Reform in Developing Countries: Property Rights and Property Wrongs is a 2009 book by the Leontief Prize–winning economist Michael Lipton. It is a comprehensive review of land reform issues in developing countries and focuses on the evidence of which land reforms have worked and which have not.

Summary of the book

The introduction defines land reform as comprising "laws with the main goal of reducing poverty by substantially increasing the proportion of farmland controlled by the poor, and thereby their income, power or status"(the appendix gives a more precise definition). It then expands on what is meant by poverty and how land reform still "matters", especially as according to Lipton "land is poor people's main productive asset" and "at least 1.5 billion people today have some farmland as a result of land reform, and are less poor, or not poor, as a result." However, for Lipton, "huge, inefficient land inequalities remain, or have re-emerged, in many low-income countries. Land reform remains both 'unfinished business' (...) and alive and well."

Chapter 1 analyses the goals of stakeholders involved in land reform: public authorities, landowners, farmers and other directly affected persons as well as the goals for land reform advocated by outsiders, from aid donors to economists and philosophers. Land reform normally advances one widely shared goal, equality of opportunity, but it can retard another, liberty to enjoy 'legitimate' property rights. This chapter looks at the trade-offs and how various types of claimed land reform affect these goals and others, notably poverty reduction, sustainability, economic efficiency and economic growth.

Chapter 2 explores the impact of land reform and land policy on farm and non-farm growth and efficiency. It looks at the long debate on whether "there is an inverse relationship (IR) in labour-abundant countries", such that "small farms produce more, per hectare per year, than large farms".  Lipton concludes that careful and recent work in Africa and elsewhere confirms that, "mainly due to the IR plus land scarcity, redistributive land reform in developing countries normally increases farm output."

Chapters 3-6 reviews the experience with different types of policies, variously labelled as land reform. They ask: are these genuine land reforms in the sense of seeking, and moving towards, "farmland-based reduction of gross, unearned inequality and hence of poverty"? These main types of land reform are:

 the paradigm: 'classic' land reform, leading to land transfers from big to small farms (chapter 3)
 laws to stop, restrict, register, enable or encourage tenancy, overall or for particular types (chapter 4)
 other tenurial rules, for example titling of land ownership or control (chapter 4)
 collectivisation into State farming, collective farming or co-operative farming, which according to Lipton have normally proved a 'terrible detour' or 'land deform' (chapter 5)
 decollectivisation (which may be land reform if resulting land ownership is fairly equal) (chapter 5)
 other alleged paths to the aims of land reform: land consolidation, settlement, tax reform, etc. (chapter 6)
 new wave (decentralised, market-friendly and/or non-confiscatory) land reform (chapter 6)

Chapter 7 reviews the persistent allegation that land reform is dead, or was so effectively avoided that it never lived. Lipton asks the questions: Where has it happened on the ground, how much and when? He also asks: Is land reform still happening and where it is not dead, ought it to be? Lipton concludes: "In many developing countries, land reform is a live, often burning, issue ... The debate about land reform is alive and well."

Criticisms

The book overall received positive reviews and endorsements (see below). However, Andrew Dorward did have some "minor gripes" within his very positive review. He wished that it did not finish so abruptly and that it had a final chapter "summing up the main lessons from the book for the next generation of researchers, analysts and practitioners in the field." He would also have liked to have seen "more explicit attention to interactions of land reform with gender and the environment."

Abhijit Sen, while giving it an overall positive review, found that:

He also finished his review with some further critiques, especially in relation to land reform in India:

Endorsements
The book received positive endorsements from a wide range of authors, including Jeffrey Sachs, Nicholas Stern, Amartya Sen, Gordon Conway, Nancy Birdsall, Paul Collier, Akin Adesina and Pramod K. Mishra.

Reviews

See also 
 Land reforms by country
 Land consolidation

External links
 The Case for Redistributional Land Reform in Developing Countries - review essay of the book - Albert Berry, Development and Change 2011 42(2): 637–648. 
 Land Reform in Developing Countries: Property Rights and Property Wrongs - Book review -  Andrew Dorward,  Journal of Agricultural Economics 2012 2: 484–486.
 Land Reform in Developing Countries: Property Rights and Property Wrongs - a review - Keijiro Otsuka, EH.Net 2012
 Land Reform in Developing Countries: Property Rights and Property Wrongs - book review - Joe Hill - South Asian Water Studies 2(3)
 Setting the Record Straight on Land Reform - Joe Hill - Economic & Political Weekly 2012 Vol XLVII No. 30.
 Land Reform in Developing Countries: Property Rights and Property Wrongs - book review - Herb Thompson, Journal of Contemporary Asia 2011 41 (1): 179-180
 Unfinished Tasks of Land Reform - Abhijit Sen - A review of the book - Review of Agrarian Studies 2013 3(1)
 Book Review - Land Reform in Developing Countries: Property rights and Property wrongs - Mark L Wahlqvist - Asia Pacific Journal of Clinical Nutrition 2009 18 (4): 703
 Land Reform in Developing Countries: Property Rights and Property Wrongs - book review - Christine Valente - The Journal of Development Studies 2009 45 (10)
 Book review - Land Reform in Developing Countries: Property rights and Property wrongs - Amy Ickowitz  - The Journal of Peasant Studies 2011 38(1): 193–207
 Land Reform in Developing Countries: contents, reviews, how to get it -  from the website of Michael Lipton
 Publisher webpage for the book
 Personal website of Michael Lipton

References 

2009 non-fiction books
Current affairs books
Books about economic inequality
Land reform
Development economics
Routledge books
International development
International development in Africa
Development studies